Happy Heroes is an EP by sound collage and experimental musical group Negativland, released in 1998.

Critical reception
The Memphis Flyer wrote that the EP "delivers more bang for the buck – particularly if you have a wicked sense of humor and high threshold for aural pain." The Rough Guide to Rock called it "more expert sampler anarchy."

Track listings
 "Mertz #1" - 1:43
 "Jolly Green Giant" - 7:23
 "Mertz #2" - 1:14
 "Chicken Diction" - 3:49
 "The Black Hole Tube" - 3:48
 "O.J. And His Personal Trainer Kill Ron and Nicole" - 3:12
 "Happy Hero: The Remedia Megamix" - 5:02
 "Mertz End" - 0:13

Personnel

Mark Hosler - tapes, electronics, rhythms, Booper, clarinet, organ, viola, loops, guitar, etc.
Richard Lyons - tapes, electronics, rhythms, Booper, clarinet, organ, viola, loops, guitar, etc.
David Wills - synthesizer, voice, tape
Peter Dayton - guitars, viola
W. M. Kennedy - guitar
Ernst Long - Trumpet
Phil Friehofner - Organ

References

1998 EPs
Negativland EPs
Seeland Records EPs